YAGO (Yet Another Great Ontology) is an open source knowledge base developed at the Max Planck Institute for Computer Science in Saarbrücken. It is automatically extracted from Wikipedia and other sources.

As of 2019, YAGO3 has knowledge of more than 10 million entities and contains more than 120 million facts about these entities. The information in YAGO is extracted from Wikipedia (e.g., categories, redirects, infoboxes), WordNet (e.g., synsets, hyponymy), and GeoNames. 
The accuracy of YAGO was manually evaluated to be above 95% on a sample of facts. To integrate it to the linked data cloud, YAGO has been linked to the DBpedia ontology and to the SUMO ontology.

YAGO3 is provided in Turtle and tsv formats. Dumps of the whole database are available, as well as thematic and specialized dumps. It can also be queried through various online browsers and through a SPARQL endpoint hosted by OpenLink Software. The source code of YAGO3 is available on GitHub.

YAGO has been used in the Watson artificial intelligence system.

See also
 Commonsense knowledge bases
 Cyc
 Evi (software)
 Wikidata
 DBpedia

References

External links
 New Homepage
 YAGO Homepage

Max Planck Institute for Informatics
Knowledge bases
Online databases
Creative Commons-licensed databases